The Stroud House is a historic house at SE F Street and East Central Avenue in Bentonville, Arkansas.  It is a -story wood-frame structure, with asymmetrical massing and decorative shinglework typical of the Queen Anne style, and a shed-roof front porch supported by Colonial Revival columns.  It is a high-quality local example of this transitional style of architecture, built in 1903 by Daniel Boone Laine and Delila Laine.  The property also includes remnants of a 1925 gas station.

The house was listed on the National Register of Historic Places in 1986.

See also
Stroud House (Rogers, Arkansas)
National Register of Historic Places listings in Benton County, Arkansas

References

Houses on the National Register of Historic Places in Arkansas
Queen Anne architecture in Arkansas
Colonial Revival architecture in Arkansas
Houses completed in 1903
Houses in Bentonville, Arkansas
National Register of Historic Places in Bentonville, Arkansas
1903 establishments in Arkansas